The Volkswagen Tarok is a concept compact pickup truck created by the German car manufacturer Volkswagen for Brazil.

Introduction 
The Volkswagen Tarok premiered as a concept car at the São Paulo International Motor Show in Brazil on 6 November 2018.

The Tarok concept car was then introduced to the North American market at the 2019 New York International Auto Show. 

Due to the 2020 financial crisis and the COVID-19 pandemic, the Tarok has yet to begin production in Brazil or any other market. The vehicle has not been officially cancelled, however.

Features 
The dashboard is equipped with 100% digital virtual cockpit, and the dashboard receives a central touchscreen.

Engines 
The Tarok receives two engines of 150hp, a four-cylinder diesel 2.0 TDi and a four-cylinder 1.4 TSI, running with pure ethanol (E100) or a gasoline ethanol mixture (E22).

References

Tarok
Pickup trucks
All-wheel-drive vehicles
Cars introduced in 2018
Cars of Brazil